An Access Point Name (APN) is the name of a gateway between a mobile network (GSM, GPRS, 3G, 4G and 5G) and another computer network, frequently the public Internet.

A mobile device making a data connection must be configured with an APN to present to the carrier. The carrier will then examine this identifier to determine what type of network connection should be created, for example: which IP addresses should be assigned to the wireless device, which security methods should be used, and how, or if, it should be connected to some private customer network.

More specifically, the APN identifies the packet data network (PDN) that a mobile data user wants to communicate with. In addition to identifying a PDN, an APN may also be used to define the type of service, (e.g. connection to Wireless Application Protocol (WAP) server, Multimedia Messaging Service (MMS)) that is provided by the PDN. APN is used in 3GPP data access networks, e.g. General Packet Radio Service (GPRS), evolved packet core (EPC).

Structure of an APN 

A structured APN consists of two parts as shown in the accompanying figure.
 Network Identifier: Defines the external network to which the Gateway GPRS Support Node (GGSN) is connected. Optionally, it may also include the service requested by the user. This part of the APN is mandatory
 Operator Identifier: Defines the specific operator's packet domain network in which the GGSN is located. This part of the APN is optional. The MCC is the mobile country code and the MNC is the mobile network code which together uniquely identify a mobile network operator.

Examples of APN are:
  (Note: This example APN uses a domain name from the DNS which belongs to the operator)
 
 
 
  (Note: This APN example does not contain an operator)
  (Note: Does not contain an operator, however in practice it is AT&T Mobility's LTE APN)
  (Note: No operator, but the APN name clearly identifies Verizon Wireless)
  (Note: APN name clearly identifies operator Mobitel)
  (Note: APN name clearly identifies operator Jio)

LTE networks use APN-FQDN format, which differs from the 2G/3G format described above as follows.  "apn.epc." is inserted before "mnc", and the ".gprs" at the end becomes ".3gppnetwork.org" 

For example: the 2G/3G internet.mnc012.mcc345.gprs becomes internet.apn.epc.mnc012.mcc345.3gppnetwork.org .

References

External links 
 
 
 

Mobile telecommunications standards
3GPP standards
GSM standard